Council of Civil Service Unions v Minister for the Civil Service , or the GCHQ case, is a United Kingdom constitutional law and UK labour law case that held the royal prerogative was subject to judicial review.

In 1984, by issuing an Order in Council using the royal prerogative, the government of Margaret Thatcher banned employees of the Government Communications Headquarters (GCHQ) from joining any trade union for "national security" reasons. The Council of Civil Service Unions claimed in judicial review that the order defeated their legitimate expectation of being able to collectively bargain for fair wages. The High Court of Justice held the Order in Council was invalid. The Court of Appeal held national security concerns meant that judicial review was impossible. The House of Lords held that exercises of the royal prerogative were subject to judicial review, but there were exceptions, including for matters of national security. This was a significant break from the previous law, which held that prerogative powers were not in any way subject to judicial review. The GCHQ case established that judicial review depends on the nature of the government's powers, not their source.

Facts

The Government Communications Headquarters (GCHQ) is a British intelligence agency that provides signals intelligence to the British government and armed forces. Prior to 1983, its existence was not acknowledged although it openly recruited graduates. After a spy scandal in 1983, the organisation became known to the public, and Margaret Thatcher's government decided a year later that employees would not be allowed to join a trade union for reasons of national security. The Minister for the Civil Service is a position held ex officio by the Prime Minister.

That was done through an Order in Council, an exercise of the royal prerogative. Despite an extensive publicity campaign by trade unions, the government refused to reverse its decision but instead offered affected employees the choice between £1,000 and the membership of a staff association or dismissal. Employees dismissed could not rely on an industrial tribunal since they were not covered by the relevant employment legislation. As such, the Council of Civil Service Unions decided that judicial review was the only available route.

The decision to ban workers at GCHQ from trade union membership had been taken after the meeting of a select group of ministers and the prime minister, rather than the full Cabinet. That is not unusual, even in relation to high-profile decisions: a decision was similarly taken to authorise the Suez operation in 1956, and the same procedure was used in the decision to transfer the ability to set interest rates to the Bank of England in 1997.

Judgment

High Court
In the High Court, Glidewell J held that the employees of GCHQ had a right to consultation, and that the lack of consultation made the decision invalid.

Court of Appeal
In the Court of Appeal, Lord Lane CJ, Watkins LJ and May LJ held that judicial review could not be used to challenge the use of the royal prerogative. They decided that as the determination of national security issues is an executive function, it would be inappropriate for the courts to intervene.

House of Lords

The House of Lords held the royal prerogative was subject to judicial review, just like statutory instruments. However, on national security grounds, the action of restricting the trade union was justified. Lords Fraser, Scarman and Diplock all believed that the issue of national security was outside the remit of the courts. Lord Diplock wrote "it is par excellence a non-justiciable question. The judicial process is totally inept to deal with the sort of problems which it involves." Lord Fraser stated that while the courts would not by default accept the government's argument that the matter was one of national security, it was a "matter of evidence" and the evidence provided in this case showed that the government was correct. Lord Diplock held that any prerogative power which impacted on a person's "private rights or legitimate expectations" was amenable to review, while Lords Fraser and Brightman held that only powers delegated from the monarch could be subject to judicial review as a candidate for such a review as the powers in question had been delegated from the monarch to the Minister for the Civil Service.

Lord Diplock said the following:

Lord Roskill said the following:

Significance

The courts have traditionally been unwilling to subject prerogative powers to judicial review. Judges were willing to state only whether or not powers existed, not whether they had been used appropriately. They therefore applied only the first of the Wednesbury tests: whether the use was illegal. Constitutional scholars such as William Blackstone would have considered that to be appropriate.

The GCHQ case, therefore, was highly important since it held that the application of judicial review would be dependent on the nature of the government's powers, not their source. While the use of the royal prerogative for national security reasons is considered outside the scope of the courts, most of its other uses are now judicially reviewable in some form.

The GCHQ case also confirmed that non-legal conventions might be subject to "legitimate expectation". A convention would not have usually been litigable, and it was necessary for the court to demonstrate that it was in the present case: such a rule had been established in respect of Cabinet conventions in Attorney General v Jonathan Cape Ltd. Although the court ruled against the union, it was accepted that the invariable practice of the executive formed a basis for legitimate expectation.

The case also shows that national security remains a political issue, not a legal one: it is not to be determined by a court.

It summarises the scope of judicial review.

Further developments

The Council of Civil Service Unions, with others, submitted the case to the European Court of Human Rights, however it was deemed inadmissible.

In R (Bancoult) v Secretary of State for Foreign and Commonwealth Affairs (No 2), heard at the House of Lords, one of the matters decided was whether or not the courts could subject Orders in Council to judicial review. The Lords unanimously agreed that although Orders in Council were defined as "primary legislation" in the Human Rights Act, there is a significant difference in that Orders in Council are an executive product and lack the "representative character" that comes with parliamentary authority and approval. As such, the Lords saw "no reason why prerogative legislation should not be subject to review on ordinary principles of legality, rationality and procedural impropriety in the same way as any other executive action".

In R (Miller) v The Prime Minister and Cherry v Advocate General for Scotland [2019] UKSC 41 the Supreme Court quashed an Order in Council that sought to prorogue Parliament.

References

Bibliography

 

1984 in case law
1984 in England
1984 in British law
British trade unions history
United Kingdom administrative case law
United Kingdom constitutional case law
GCHQ
House of Lords cases
Labour disputes in the United Kingdom
Margaret Thatcher
Royal prerogative
United Kingdom trade union case law
United Kingdom labour case law